Old Fort Schuyler was a Revolutionary War fort that existed in Upstate New York. It is the present-day location of the city of Utica.

References 

Forts in New York (state)